King's Leadership Academy may refer to:

King's Leadership Academy Hawthornes, a secondary school in Bootle, Merseyside, England
King's Leadership Academy Liverpool, a secondary school in Liverpool, Merseyside, England
King's Leadership Academy Warrington, a secondary school in Warrington, Cheshire, England

See also
The King's Academy (disambiguation)